AOU may refer to:

 American Ornithological Society, formerly the American Ornithologists' Union
 Apparent oxygen utilisation
 Arab Open University, private university
 Aou (trigraph)
 Age of Ultron, a 2013 series published by Marvel Comics
Avengers: Age of Ultron, a 2015 superhero film of the same name by Marvel Studios